Fletcher is a town in Franklin County, Vermont, United States. The population was 1,346 at the 2020 census.

Geography
Fletcher is located in southern Franklin County, bordered to the southeast by Lamoille County. The Lamoille River forms the short southern boundary of the town. Metcalf Pond is located in the north-central part of town.

The town contains the settlements of Fletcher, West Fletcher, East Fletcher, and Binghamville. The Binghamville United Methodist Church and Fletcher General Store are located in Binghamville. Vermont Route 108 passes through East Fletcher, leading north to Enosburg Falls and south to Jeffersonville.  The Fletcher Union Church, also known as the Fletcher Community House, is a historic former church building on Town Highway 1 (Cambridge Road).  Built in 1871, it is one of only a few public buildings in the community, and has for over a century been a secular community meeting space.  It was listed on the National Register of Historic Places in 1982.

Demographics

As of the census of 2000, there were 1,179 people, 428 households, and 324 families residing in the town.  The population density was 31.2 people per square mile (12.0/km2).  There were 510 housing units at an average density of 13.5 per square mile (5.2/km2).  The racial makeup of the town was 96.78% White, 0.76% Native American, 0.34% Asian, 0.34% from other races, and 1.78% from two or more races. Hispanic or Latino of any race were 0.34% of the population.

There were 428 households, out of which 42.5% had children under the age of 18 living with them, 66.4% were married couples living together, 4.9% had a female householder with no husband present, and 24.1% were non-families. 18.5% of all households were made up of individuals, and 4.7% had someone living alone who was 65 years of age or older.  The average household size was 2.75 and the average family size was 3.12.

In the town, the population was spread out, with 28.7% under the age of 18, 7.7% from 18 to 24, 33.2% from 25 to 44, 24.8% from 45 to 64, and 5.7% who were 65 years of age or older.  The median age was 35 years. For every 100 females, there were 113.2 males.  For every 100 females age 18 and over, there were 107.1 males.

The median income for a household in the town was $46,146, and the median income for a family was $49,375. Males had a median income of $34,583 versus $20,391 for females. The per capita income for the town was $20,498.  About 4.0% of families and 6.3% of the population were below the poverty line, including 9.3% of those under age 18 and 11.6% of those age 65 or over.

Notable people
 Anson Call, Mormon pioneer
 Elmina M. Roys Gavitt (1828–1898), physician; medical journal founder, editor-in-chief 
 Donly C. Hawley, mayor of Burlington, Vermont
 Elias B. Holmes, Congressman from New York
 Milo White, Congressman from Minnesota

References

External links
 Town of Fletcher unofficial website

 
Towns in Vermont
Burlington, Vermont metropolitan area
Towns in Franklin County, Vermont